Terry Burgess (20 July 1934 – 28 August 2005) was an  Australian rules footballer who played with St Kilda in the Victorian Football League (VFL).

Notes

External links 

1934 births
2005 deaths
Australian rules footballers from Tasmania
St Kilda Football Club players
City-South Football Club players